Hagnagora croceitincta is a species of moth of the family Geometridae first described by Paul Dognin in 1892. It is found from central Colombia to south-eastern Peru.

The length of the forewings is about 23 mm. Adults are conspicuously coloured, with orange, dark brown and white patterns.

References

Moths described in 1892
Larentiinae